Kevin L. Boyce (born October 5, 1971) is an American politician of the Democratic Party. He currently serves as President of the Franklin County Board of Commissioners. Formerly he was a member of the Ohio House of Representatives, serving the 25th District from 2012 to 2016, a member of Columbus City Council, and was Ohio State Treasurer from 2009 to 2010.

In the March 2016 Democratic primary election, Boyce was selected as the Democratic nominee to run for incumbent Paula Brooks' seat on the Franklin County, Ohio Board of Commissioners in the 2016 general election. Boyce ran for, and was elected to a second term in 2020.

Education
Boyce graduated from Columbus East High School in 1990. He obtained a Bachelor of Arts degree in political science from the University of Toledo in 1995 and a Master of Public Administration degree from Central Michigan University in 2004.

Career
Prior to holding political office, Boyce was the executive director of the KnowledgeWorks Foundation, a nonprofit organization that promotes college access for high school students.  He was also the executive director of the Ohio Legislative Black Caucus from 1997 to 1999.  He managed Charleta B. Tavares' unsuccessful campaign for Ohio Secretary of State in 1998, and was Chief of Staff for the Minority Caucus of the Ohio House of Representatives from January 1999 to September 2000.

On September 11, 2000, Boyce was appointed to Columbus City Council. He was elected to one of three open Council seats in the November 6, 2001 election and won another four-year Council term on November 8, 2005. On the council, Boyce ultimately served as President pro Tempore and as Chairman of the Finance and Zoning Committees.

On December 23, 2008, Democratic Governor Ted Strickland announced Boyce's appointment as Ohio State Treasurer, to replace Richard Cordray, who left office in November 2008 to become Ohio Attorney General.   On January 8, 2009,  Boyce was sworn into office, becoming the first African-American Democrat to hold a statewide, non-judicial office in Ohio.  In July 2009, the Dayton Daily News published an article alleging that Boyce had spent $32,469 on promotional items with his name on them.  Despite Boyce's arguments that such practices were common for political officeholders and that he had spent 30% less than did his predecessor on such items, Boyce's Republican opponent in the 2010 campaign, state Rep. Josh Mandel, charged that the expenditures were inappropriate given the state's budget difficulties.  Boyce also was criticized for hiring Democratic party operatives for several positions within his office.

Boyce was further questioned for awarding a $160,000 per year contract to Key Bank for processing the state's checks.  While Ohio had previously processed its own checks for 100 years, Boyce expected that the new contract would save approximately $83,000 per year through increased interest earnings.  The contract was awarded in a competitive bid process, but critics questioned it because two Key Bank lobbyists held a $500 per ticket fundraiser for Boyce one week after the contract was awarded.

State Treasurer
Boyce ran for the Treasurer's position for the first time during the 2010 midterm elections against Republican challenger Josh Mandel, but lost the election with 40.2% of the vote.

After losing re-election in 2010, Boyce recommended his top aide, Amer Ahmad, to Chicago Mayor Rahm Emanuel for Comptroller of Chicago, even though Boyce had received federal subpoenas asking about Ahmad's involvement in contracts given to a Boston bank. Ahmad was indicted in August 2013, charged with eight counts of bribery, wire fraud and conspiracy for his actions as Ohio deputy treasurer under Boyce. Ahmad is a fugitive from justice in Pakistan. He was sentenced to 15 years in US prison, but is unlikely to be extradited.

The National Council of Negro Women presented Boyce its Community Service Plaque in May 2004. He was honored by the Phi Beta Sigma fraternity and Leadership At Its Best LLC as an outstanding role model for young men in November 2004.

Ohio House of Representatives
When W. Carlton Weddington was indicted in a bribery scandal in early 2012, he resigned his seat, forcing House Democrats to appoint his successor.  It was soon after announced that Boyce would be the appointee, chosen over a number of applicants. Boyce was sworn into office on May 6, 2012. In 2012, Boyce won his first full term in the House with 85.84% of the vote over Republican Seth Golding.

In 2014, Boyce won a second term with 81% of the vote, and was elected soon after to serve as Minority Whip as well.  He was also the only Democrat to hold a Chairmanship in the 131st Ohio General Assembly, as the Chair of the Committee on Community and Family Advancement's Subcommittee on Minority Affairs.

Committee assignments
Committee on Community & Family Advancement
Subcommittee on Minority Affairs (Chair)
Committee on Finance & Appropriations
Committee on Rules & Reference

Franklin County Board of Commissioners
In the March 15, 2016 Democratic primary election, Boyce defeated incumbent Paula Brooks in her bid for re-election to the Franklin County Board of Commissioners, receiving 58% of the vote to Brooks' 42%. In an unusual move, the Franklin County Democratic Party endorsed Boyce rather than the incumbent Brooks, in part as a consequence of Brooks' support for county sheriff Zach Scott in his failed effort to oppose Andy Ginther, who received the party's endorsement for mayor of Columbus in the preceding general election. Scott was also defeated in the March 2016 primary election in his effort to continue as county sheriff. Boyce then defeated his Republican opponent Terry Boyd in the November, 2016 general election.

On November 3, 2020, Boyce defeated his Republican challenger Andrew Littler to earn a 2nd term on the Franklin County, Ohio Board of Commissioners. He currently serves as President of the Franklin County Board of Commissioners.

Electoral history

References

External links
 Kevin Boyce for Ohio
 KnowledgeWorks Foundation

1971 births
21st-century American politicians
African-American state legislators in Ohio
Central Michigan University alumni
Columbus City Council members
Living people
Democratic Party members of the Ohio House of Representatives
State treasurers of Ohio
University of Toledo alumni
21st-century African-American politicians
20th-century African-American people